The canton of Castelginest is an administrative division of the Haute-Garonne department, southern France. It was created at the French canton reorganisation which came into effect in March 2015. Its seat is in Castelginest.

It consists of the following communes:
 
Aucamville
Bruguières
Castelginest
Fenouillet
Fonbeauzard
Gagnac-sur-Garonne
Gratentour
Lespinasse
Saint-Alban
Saint-Jory

References

Cantons of Haute-Garonne